Pečenjevce is a settlement in south-east Serbia (Jablanica District), located at municipality Leskovac. The settlement is a native place of a famous Serbian folk singer Toma Zdravković. The origin of the town name is reported to be from Turkic Pechenegs who settled in the area during the Middle Ages. 

Populated places in Jablanica District